Noy Number Bipod Sanket (English: Danger Signal Number Nine) is a 2007 Bengali Comedy-Drama Film directed by Humayun Ahmed. The film stars Rahmat Ali, Challenger, Jayanta Chattopadhyay, Shadhin Khosru, Tania Ahmed, Rupok Talukder, Shabnam Parvin, Maznun Mizan and Diti in lead roles. The film was shot in Nuhash Polli.

Plot
Mr. Shobhan (Rahmat Ali) is an unhappy father, whose two daughters and a son lives away from him. They are too busy in their life that they hardly visits their father. So Mr. Shobhan hits a plan and lies his daughters and son about his death and tricks them to come to his mansion. When they come, they find out that it was just a trick to bring them. So, the family reunites. But everybody were frightened and surprised at Mr. Shobhan. Then suddenly a girl called Ranjana (Tania Ahmed) comes. No one knows by whom she was invited. But she makes everyone happy except the two sisters. They are jealous of Ranjana as their husbands are talking to her, dancing with her. Many funny incidents happens around Ranjana. Later, it shows that Ranjana was invited by Togor (son of Mr. Shobhan), who forgot that he invited her. At the end of the film Togor marries Ranjana, Manager marries Mutky and Mizan marries Rohima (house-maid of Hasan). The film ends with Mr. Shobhan saying, "If you like the movie - it's ok. If you don't like - no problem."

Cast 
 Rahmat Ali as Mr. Shobhan
 Jayanta Chattopadhyay as The Manager 
 Challenger as Karim (Husband of Ratri)
 Shadhin Khosru as Hasan (Husband of The youngest daughter)
 Rupok Talukder as Togor (The son of Mr. Shobhan)
 Tania Ahmed as Ranjana / Jori 
 Shabnam Parvin as Mutky (The house-maid) 
 Maznun Mizan as Mizan (The man with the manager) 
 Diti as Ratri (The eldest daughter) 
 Taniya Sultana Munni as The youngest daughter
 Choity as Hasan's house-maid

Guest Appearance
 Shohel Khan as doctor
 Asaduzzaman Noor as blacksmith
 Faruque Ahmed as first Mawlana
 Komol as second Mawlana
 Syed Hasan Sohel as third Mawlana

References

External links
 

2007 films
Bengali-language Bangladeshi films
Bangladeshi comedy films
Films directed by Humayun Ahmed
Films shot in Bangladesh
2000s Bengali-language films
Impress Telefilm films